Octavius Richard Hanbury (16 February 1826 – 3 May 1882) was an English first-class cricketer.

The son of Octavius Hanbury senior, he was born at Bath in February 1826. He was educated at Rugby School,  before going up to Trinity College, Oxford. While studying at Oxford, he made a single appearance in first-class cricket for Oxford University against Cambridge University in The University Match of 1849. Opening the batting in both of Oxford's innings', he was dismissed in their first-innings for 12 runs by Edward Blore, while in their second-innings he was dismissed without scoring by the same bowler. With the ball, he took the wicket of Charles Jenyns in the Cambridge first-innings, while in their second-innings he took the wickets of William Deacon and Jenyns. He later settled on the West Coast of the United States, before returning to England, where he died at Westminster in May 1882.

References

External links

1826 births
1882 deaths
People from Bath, Somerset
People educated at Rugby School
Alumni of Trinity College, Oxford
English cricketers
Oxford University cricketers